The Marche Leon least gecko (Sphaerodactylus elasmorhynchus), also known commonly as the snout-shield sphaero, is a species of lizard in the family Sphaerodactylidae. The species is endemic to Haiti.

Geographic range
S. elasmorhynchus is known only from the type locality: "ca. 5 km (airline) SSE Marché Léon ... Haiti".

Reproduction
S. elasmorhynchus is oviparous.

References

Further reading
Thomas R (1966). "A new Hispaniolan gecko". Breviora (253): 1–5. (Sphaerodactylus elasmorhynchus, new species).
Schwartz A, Thomas R (1975). A Check-list of West Indian Amphibians and Reptiles. Carnegie Museum of Natural History Special Publication No. 1. Pittsburgh, Pennsylvania: Carnegie Museum of Natural History. 216 pp. (Sphaerodactylus elasmorhynchus, p. 150).

Sphaerodactylus
Reptiles of Haiti
Endemic fauna of Haiti
Reptiles described in 1966